Garstedt is a municipality in the district of Harburg in Lower Saxony in Germany.

References

Harburg (district)